Miss USA 2019 was the 68th Miss USA pageant. It was held at the Grand Sierra Resort in Reno, Nevada, on May 2, 2019. Nick Lachey and Vanessa Lachey served as hosts, while Lu Sierra served as commentator, all for the second consecutive time and was broadcast on Fox. Additionally, it featured performances from T-Pain and Nick Lachey.

Sarah Rose Summers of Nebraska crowned her successor Cheslie Kryst of North Carolina at the end of the event. This was North Carolina's third time winning the Miss USA title, and the first title in 10 years. Kryst was the first non-consecutive African American to win the title and the third one in four years. Kryst represented the United States at Miss Universe 2019 and placed in the Top 10.

The 2019 competition served as the second consecutive time that the pageant has been held concurrently with the Miss Teen USA competition. This was also the final pageant where it was televised on Fox.

Background

Location

On March 28, 2019, the Miss Universe Organization (MUO) confirmed that the pageant would be held on May 2 at the Grand Sierra Resort in Reno, Nevada. Shortly afterwards, it was confirmed that Miss USA 2018 hosts Nick Lachey and Vanessa Lachey would be returning to host the 2019 competition.

Following the announcement of Reno being selected as the competition's host city, it emerged that the MUO were originally planning on holding the competition in Honolulu, Hawaii. The plan was rejected by Hawaiian officials and relocated to Reno by the MUO after the Hawaii Tourism Authority (HTA) reported that they would be unable to secure the funds to host the competition that the MUO had requested, adding that they would be interested in hosting in the future.

Selection of participants
Delegates from 50 states and the District of Columbia were selected in state pageants began in August 2018 and ended in January 2019. The first state pageant was Alaska, held on August 4, 2018, and the final pageants were California, Kentucky and New Mexico, both held on January 27, 2019. Seven of them were former Miss Teen USA state winners, three of them were former Miss America state winners and two of them were former Miss America's Outstanding Teen state winners.

Results

Special award

Pageant

Preliminary round
Prior to the final competition, the delegates competed the preliminary competition, which involved private interviews with the judges and a presentation show where they competed in swim wear and evening gown. It was held on April 29 at the Grand Sierra Resort in Reno-Tahoe hosted by KOLO-TV meteorologist Jeff Thompson and Sarah Rose Summers.

Finals
The format remained the same as the previous year, during the final competition, the top 15 competed in swim wear, while the top 10 also competed in evening gown. The top five also competed in a question round against current affairs from the contestants who are outside of top 15, while the final three also competed in the final question round and a final runway, and the winner was decided by a panel of judges alongside the two runners-up.

Judges
 Nicole Feld – businesswoman, producer, and vice president for Feld Entertainment, Inc.
 Kim Kaupe – businesswoman and co-founder of The Superfan Company
 Demi-Leigh Nel-Peters – Miss Universe 2017 from South Africa
 Ukonwa Ojo – marketing executive for CoverGirl, Rimmel, and Vera Wang
 Amy Palmer – journalist and media entrepreneur
 Denise Quiñones – Miss Universe 2001 from Puerto Rico
 Hillary Schieve – politician and Mayor of Reno, Nevada
 Patricia Smith – philanthropist and Miss Virginia USA 1994

Contestants
Contestant stats provided via the Miss Universe Organization.

Notes

References

External links

 Miss USA official website

2019
May 2019 events in the United States
2019 beauty pageants
Beauty pageants in the United States
2019 in Nevada